Jelena Jakšić (born c. 1475 - died after 1536) was titular Despotissa of Serbia, first by marriage with Jovan Branković, who was titular Despot of Serbia from 1493 to 1502, and then by marriage with Ivaniš Berislavić, who held the same title, from 1503 to 1514. Jelena's son (from the second marriage) Stjepan Berislavić also held the title (Despot of Serbia), from 1520 to 1535.

Life

Jelena was daughter of Stefan Jakšić (d. 1489), of the Jakšić noble family. Her father was one of the most notable Serbian nobles in the Kingdom of Hungary. In 1486, Hungarian king Matthias Corvinus (d. 1490) granted the title Despot of Serbia to Đorđe Branković, elder son of Stefan Branković (d. 1476), former Despot of Serbia (1458-1459). Soon after that, Jelena was married to Đorđe's younger brother Jovan Branković. In 1493, Jovan was also granted the title, as it was customary in the Kingdom of Hungary that various senior posts should be held jointly by two incumbents. When her husband became titular despot, she became despotissa. They lived at the castle Kupinik in the Syrmia County, and had several daughters.

In 1496, her brother in law Đorđe decided to relinquish all of his titles and possessions in favor his brother Jovan, Jelena's husband. In the same time, Đorđe took monastic vows, adopting the name Maksim. Jovan remained the sole despot until 1502, when he died, without male hairs, and his widow Jelena was left with several minor daughters, trying to secure their inheritance.

In 1503–1504, Hungarian king Vladislaus II (d. 1516) decided to remarry Jelena to Ivaniš Berislavić (d. 1514), a prominent noble from the Požega County, granting him the title Despot of Serbia, and also transferring to him Branković family estates. Jelena and Ivaniš had two sons and two daughters. Ivaniš died in 1514, while their sons were still minors, and Jelena took charge of family affairs, until 1520, when Hungarian king Louis II (d. 1526) appointed her elder son Stjepan Berislavić as new titular Despot of Serbia. She died sometime after 1536.

Family

From her first marriage, with Jovan Branković (d. 1502), Jelena had several daughters:

 Marija, married to Ferdinand Frankopan, of the House of Frankopan
 Jelena, married to Peter IV Rareş, Prince of Moldavia

From her second marriage, with Ivaniš Berislavić (d. 1514), Jelena also had several children:
 Stjepan Berislavić (d. 1535), titular Despot of Serbia
 Nikola Berislavić (d. after 1527)
 two daughters (names unknown)

Some researchers have suggested, after taking into account the dates of Jelena's marriages and also the dates of marriages of her daughters, that some of her daughters who are usually considered to be from her first marriage, might in fact be from her second marriage.

References

Sources

 
 
 
 
 
 
 
 
 
 
 

Serbian royal consorts
15th-century Serbian royalty
16th-century Serbian royalty
Jelena
Serbian Despotate
1470s births
1530s deaths